This list of the tallest buildings and structures in Israel ranks skyscrapers and towers in Israel by height.

The list is sorted by official height; where two or more structures share the same height, equal ranking is given and the structures are then listed in floors order. If the height and the floors are the same, the structures are then listed in alphabetical order.

Tallest buildings in Israel

Above 150 meters

120–150 meters

Tallest building history

Tallest by usage
The list below shows the tallest buildings by their usage. Note that the buildings in the list are considered only if the entire tower is for the usage listed; buildings with multiple usages aren't considered.

Under construction

Tallest structures

The following is a list of all structures in Israel with a height greater than 100 m. A structure differs from a high-rise by its lack of floors and habitability.

See also
List of tallest structures in the Middle East
List of tallest buildings in Asia
List of skyscrapers
List of tallest buildings in Tel Aviv
List of tallest buildings in Ramat Gan
Jerusalem Gateway Project

References

External links
Israel at Emporis
Israel at CTBUH
Israel at SkyscraperPage.com

Israel
 
Israel
Israel
Architecture in Israel